The 2020 Seton Hall Pirates men's soccer team represented Seton Hall University during the 2020 NCAA Division I men's soccer season and the 2020 Big East Conference men's soccer season. The 2020 season was Andreas Lindberg's third year as head coach for the program.

Seton Hall won the Big East Conference Men's Soccer Tournament for the first time since 1992, and qualified for the NCAA Division I Men's Soccer Tournament for the first time since 2005.

Background 

Seton Hall finished the 2019 season with a 6–9–1 (3–5–1) record. They did not qualify for the Big East or NCAA Tournaments.

Effects of the COVID-19 pandemic on the season 
On August 12, 2020, the Big East Conference suspended all fall sports including men's soccer, with plans to reconvene in the spring of 2021.

On November 4, 2020, the NCAA approved a plan for college soccer to be played in the spring.

Schedule

Regular season

Postseason

Big East Tournament

NCAA Tournament

References 

2020
Seton Hall Pirates
Seton Hall Pirates
Seton Hall Pirates men's soccer
Seton